Star Trek: Khan is a five-issue comic book prequel and sequel to the 2013 film Star Trek Into Darkness by IDW Publishing. It follows Khan Noonien Singh, explaining his past and how he came to have a change in facial appearance and serve Admiral Alexander Marcus.

Plot

Issue One

Issue One starts with the trial of Khan Noonien Singn on stardate 2259.246 (September 3, 2259). Khan is brought forward, where he states that he rejects the court's authority. But Kirk note that the defendant calling himself Khan, looks nothing like the records of Khan Noonien Singn and asks him who he really is. In New Delhi in November 1971, a group of children are gassed and taken by masked men. A year later, in January 1972, Doctor Heisen is talking to a group of investors about investing in his eugenics experiment to create super soldiers. Heisen then takes a look at his test subjects, 24 boys and 15 girls, when he notices one with one leg being picked and notices his fury when he beats them. A year later, Dr. Heisen is in his office with the crippled boy who is seen to have regrown his leg through the genetic experiments that have been performed on him. Heisen shows the boy his computer and explains how he wishes for the boy to use it to unlock all of the knowledge of the world, the boy named Noonien Singh. By 1979 all the children make progress in their intellectual and physical prowess. Doctor Heisen observes a sparring session between Noonien and another boy using real knives. After scratching the other boy and seeing his wounds heal instantly, Noonien tests his own regenerative powers by impaling himself with both of his knives. While in a recovery room, Noonien hacks into the facility's security system and disables it, then proceeds to escape by digging out through the solid rock floor. Dr. Heisen goes to retrieve Noonien from the Gobi desert by incapacitating him using a neural inhibitor that has been implanted into all of the subjects. In August 1985 Noonien Singn presents Heisen with a box filled with all of the students removed neural inhibitors. He crushes Dr. Heisen's skull with his bare hands before informing his companions that the world is waiting for them.

2014 comics debuts
Comics based on Star Trek
Prequel comics
Sequel comics